Rusty Brown is a continuing series of comics by American cartoonist Chris Ware, named after its protagonist. In the strip, Brown is shown as a young Nebraskan boy and as a man approaching middle age, who has a lifelong obsession with collecting action figures and similar pop cultural detritus, particularly Supergirl.

Rusty Brown's only friend throughout his life is Chalky White. White is also a collector of G.I. Joe and other action figures, but gives up collecting as he grows up, gets married, and starts a family, unlike his friend Rusty, who remains locked in a permanent manchild state, always looking for elements of his lost childhood like lunchboxes, Funny Face drink cups, and more.

A recurring theme in the series is Rusty's greedy, egocentric, and bold behavior opposed to Chalky's kind, timid, and often naïve nature. Rusty is often utilizing tricks to swindle Chalky of his action figures, while Chalky, being highly gullible, is never able to see through Rusty's true nature.

Pantheon Books published in September 2019 the first volume of Rusty Brown (collecting stories Ware began writing and illustrating in 2001).

References

Comics characters
Comics by Chris Ware